Mollahəsənli (also, Mollagasanli and Molla-Gasanly) is a village and municipality in the Dashkasan Rayon of Azerbaijan.

References 

Populated places in Dashkasan District